The Bagyrlai is a river in Akzhaik District, West Kazakhstan Region, and Inder District, Atyrau Region, Kazakhstan. The river was originally a branch of an ancient delta of the Ural.

Its water is fresh, but mostly turbid. It is used for agricultural purposes and the riverbanks are a grazing ground for local cattle.

Course 
The Bagyrlai begins branching off the right side of the Ural river northwest of the village of Atameken (until 1994 Antonovo), close to Bazartobe. It heads southwards parallel to the Ural, forming meanders. Its mouth is to the north of lake Terenkyzyl, where it disperses in the sand about  WSW of Orlik, a town on the banks of the Ural river.

The Bagyrlai valley and channel are wide. The right bank is generally steep. The river freezes yearly between December and April.
There are other small earthen dams along its course.

See also
List of rivers of Kazakhstan

References

External links

Водные ресурсы - GOV.KZ
The current state of cross-border rivers of Kazakhstan and problems of their joint using

Rivers of Kazakhstan
West Kazakhstan Region
Atyrau Region
Distributaries
Ural basin
Caspian Depression
Important Bird Areas of Kazakhstan